China Eastern Airlines Corporation Limited, also known as China Eastern, is an airline headquartered in the China Eastern Airlines Building, on the grounds of Shanghai Hongqiao International Airport in Changning District, Shanghai. It is one of the "Big Three" airlines (alongside Air China and China Southern Airlines) of the People's Republic of China, operating international, domestic and regional routes. Hongqiao airport, along with the larger Shanghai Pudong International Airport, are China Eastern's main hubs, with secondary hubs in Beijing Daxing, Kunming, and Xi'an.

It is the second largest airline in China, in terms of passenger traffic, after China Southern Airlines. In 2021, its operation revenue is 67,127 million RMB. Its total asset is 286,548 million RMB. China Eastern and its subsidiary Shanghai Airlines became the 14th member of SkyTeam on 21 June 2011. The parent company of China Eastern Airlines Corporation Limited is China Eastern Air Holding Company.

History
China Eastern Airlines was established on 25 June 1988 under the Civil Aviation Administration of China Huadong Administration. In 1997, China Eastern took over the unprofitable China General Aviation and also became the country's first airline to offer shares on the international market. In 1998, it founded China Cargo Airlines in a joint venture with COSCO. In March 2001, it completed the takeover of Great Wall Airlines. China Yunnan Airlines and China Northwest Airlines merged into China Eastern Airlines in 2003. The company slogan is World-Class Hospitality with Eastern Charm.

The Chinese government has a majority ownership stake in China Eastern Airlines (61.64%), while some shares are publicly held (H shares, 32.19%); A shares, 6.17%. On 20 April 2006, the media broke the news of a possible sale of up to 20% of its stake to foreign investors, including Singapore Airlines, Emirates and Japan Airlines, with Singapore Airlines confirming that negotiations were underway.

After receiving approval from the State Council of China, it was announced that on 2 September 2007, Singapore Airlines and Temasek Holdings (holding company which owns 55% of Singapore Airlines) would jointly acquire shares of China Eastern Airlines. On 9 November 2007, investors signed a final agreement to buy a combined 24% stake in China Eastern Airlines: Singapore Airlines would own 15.73% and Temasek Holdings an 8.27% stake in the airline.
Singapore Airlines' pending entry into the Chinese market prompted the Hong Kong carrier Cathay Pacific to attempt to block the deal by buying a significant stake in China Eastern and voting down the deal together with Air China (which already held an 11% stake in China Eastern) at the shareholders' meeting in December 2007. However, on 24 September, Cathay Pacific announced that it had abandoned these plans.

Air China's parent company, state-owned China National Aviation Corporation, announced in January 2008 that it would offer 32% more than Singapore Airlines for the 24% stake in China Eastern, potentially complicating the deal that Singapore Airlines and Temasek had proposed by Beckett Saufley. However, minority shareholders declined the offer made by Singapore Airlines. It is thought that this was due to the massive effort made by Air China to buy the 24% stake.

On 11 June 2009, it was announced that China Eastern Airlines would merge with Shanghai Airlines.  The merger of China Eastern and Shanghai Airlines was expected to reduce excess competition between the two Shanghai-based carriers while consolidating Shanghai's status as an international aviation hub. In February 2010, the merger was completed. Shanghai Airlines became a wholly owned subsidiary of China Eastern Airlines. However, Shanghai Airlines retained its brand and livery. The new combined airline was expected to have over half of the market share in Shanghai, the financial hub of China. China Eastern Airlines also acquired China United Airlines in October 2010.

In March 2012, it was announced that China Eastern was forging a strategic alliance with the Qantas Group to set up Jetstar Hong Kong, a new low cost airline to be based at Hong Kong International Airport, which would commence operations in 2013. China Eastern would hold a 50% stake in the new airline, with the Qantas Group holding the other 50%, representing a total investment of US$198 million. However, in June 2015, the Hong Kong Air Transport Licensing Authority refused to issue an operating license to Jetstar Hong Kong. China Eastern and Qantas subsequently announced the end of the investment.

In April 2013, China Eastern received a temporary permit to operate in the Philippines, but the Civil Aviation Authority of the Philippines required them to obtain a technical permit and an airport slot.

In 2012, China Eastern was awarded the “Golden Ting Award” at the China Capital Market Annual Conference 2012, recognizing it as one of the 50 most valuable Chinese brands by WPP and ranking in the top ten of FORTUNE China's CSR ranking 2013.

On 9 September 2014, China Eastern introduced a new logo and new livery.
In 2015, the airline entered a partnership with Delta Air Lines in which Delta will buy a 3.55% share in China Eastern for $450 million.

China Eastern from 30 June 2015, launched new service to the US, as the Skyteam member plans three weekly Chengdu – Nanjing – Los Angeles operation with Airbus A330-200 (twin-jet) (A332) aircraft.

In 2017, China Eastern Airlines reported a net profit of CNY6.4 billion ($983 million), up 41% over net income of CNY4.5 billion in 2016.

On 26 February 2020, China Eastern Airlines launched OTT Airlines as a subsidiary to operate domestically produced aircraft, such as the Comac C919 and Comac ARJ21, in the Yangtze Delta region in addition to business jet operations.

Destinations

China Eastern Airlines has a strong presence on routes in Asia, North America and Australia. The airline looks to exploit the domestic market potential as it boosts flight frequencies from Shanghai to other Chinese cities. The airline is also accelerating the pace of international expansion by increasing flight frequencies to international destinations. In 2007, it began operations to New York City from Shanghai, making it the longest non-stop route for the airline. In 2016, China Eastern Airlines also launched direct flights from Shanghai to Prague, Amsterdam, Madrid and St. Petersburg.

Codeshare agreements
China Eastern Airlines has codeshare agreements with the following airlines:

 Aeroflot
 Aerolíneas Argentinas
 Air Europa
 Air France
 British Airways
 China Airlines
 China United Airlines
 Delta Air Lines
 Etihad Airways
 Garuda Indonesia
 Hong Kong Airlines
 Japan Airlines
 Joy Air
 Juneyao Airlines
 Kenya Airways
 KLM
 Korean Air
 Mandarin Airlines
 Qantas
 Royal Brunei Airlines
 Shanghai Airlines
 Sichuan Airlines
 Vietnam Airlines
 WestJet
 XiamenAir

Investor Relations

Organizational Structure

Ownership Structure

Fleet

Current fleet

, China Eastern Airlines operates the following aircraft:

China Eastern Airlines was the first Chinese airline to place an order with Airbus. The backbone of the fleet is the A320 series, which are used primarily on domestic flights.

In 2005, China Eastern Airlines placed an order for 15 Boeing 787 Dreamliners. The airline subsequently cancelled its order owing to continuous delays, instead swapped the 787 order for Boeing 737 Next Generation aircraft,

On 18 October 2011, China Eastern Airlines placed an order for 15 Airbus A330s.

China Eastern Airlines ordered 20 Boeing 777-300ERs and received its first 777-300ER aircraft on 26 September 2014.

In 2015, the airline acquired a further batch of 15 Airbus A330 aircraft for delivery in 2017 and 2018.

In April 2016, China Eastern Airlines ordered 20 Airbus A350-900 and 15 Boeing 787-9 aircraft, with deliveries commencing in 2018.

In May 2021, China Eastern Airlines introduced five A320neos and one ARJ21. At of the end of the month, the company operated a total of 738 aircraft.

Former fleet

China Eastern Airlines has previously operated the following aircraft:

Special liveries gallery

Services
China Eastern offers first class, business class, premium economy, and economy.

First class
China Eastern offers first class on all Boeing 777s. A first-class seat comes with a flat bed seat, direct aisle access and a sliding door. The plane also comes with a bar for passengers to serve themselves snacks and socialize with others. Middle seats on the Boeing 777 can be turned into a double bed.

 Business plus/ Super premium suites

The business plus product can be found on all Airbus A350 and Boeing 787 aircraft. The suites come with bigger space along with larger suite length compared to the business class seats. The business plus suites also feature sliding door and a minibar. The middle seats can be turned into a living room with seating for four.

Business class
Business class comes in many different versions. On China Eastern's narrow-body fleet, business class seats are recliners arranged in an 2-2 configuration. On select A330s, business class seats are either Zodiac Cirrus or Thompson Vantage XL which is in a 1-2-1 configuration, or it could be angled flat beds or fully flat beds arranged in a 2-2-2 configuration. On the A350 and 787, business class seats are modified Thompson Vantage XL with doors similar to Delta One suites.
On its B777, business class seats are Zodiac Cirrus.

Premium economy
Premium economy is found on all Airbus A350 and Boeing 787 aircraft.

Economy
China Eastern offers complimentary meal service and select A330s, all A350s, 777s, and 787s have seatback entertainment.

Eastern Miles
China Eastern Airlines's frequent-flyer program is called Eastern Miles. Shanghai Airlines and China United Airlines, China Eastern subsidiaries, are also parts of the program. Eastern Miles members can earn miles on flights as well as through consumption with China Eastern's credit card. When enough miles are collected, members can be upgraded to Elite membership in three tiers: Platinum, Gold and Silver.

Cargo

After the merger with Shanghai Airlines, China Eastern Airlines signaled that it would combine the two carriers' cargo subsidiaries as well. The airline's new subsidiary cargo carrier, consisting of the assets of China Cargo Airlines, Great Wall Airlines and Shanghai Airlines Cargo, commenced operations in 2011 from its base in Shanghai, China's largest air cargo market. China Eastern Airlines signed a strategic cooperation framework agreement with Shanghai Airport Group, which controls both Shanghai Hongqiao International Airport and Shanghai Pudong International Airport. The airline will allocate more capacity to Pudong Airport to open more international routes and boost flight frequencies on existing international and domestic trunk routes.

Subsidiaries

China Cargo Airlines

China Eastern Airlines' cargo subsidiary, China Cargo Airlines, is China's first all-cargo airline operating dedicated freight services using China Eastern Airlines' route structure. The cargo airline carries the same logo of China Eastern Airlines.

China United Airlines

China United Airlines is a low-cost carrier based in Beijing Daxing International Airport. It became a subsidiary of China Eastern in 2010 as a result of acquisitions.

OTT Airlines

OTT Airlines is an airline subsidiary that was launched in February 2020 to operate domestically produced aircraft like the Comac C919 and Comac ARJ21 in the Yangtze Delta region.

China Eastern Yunnan Airlines

China Eastern Yunnan Airlines, formerly known as China Yunnan Airlines, is China Eastern Airlines' local subsidiary in Yunnan province.

Incidents and accidents
 On 24 April 1989, a passenger hijacked a China Eastern Xian Y-7 en route from Ningbo to Xiamen. The hijacker, armed with a dagger and carrying dynamite, stabbed a flight attendant and demanded to be flown to Taiwan. The pilot diverted to Fuzhou instead and when the hijacker realized that he had been tricked, he blew himself up, injuring two people in the process.
 On 15 August 1989, China Eastern Airlines Flight 5510 (B-3437) operating a domestic flight from Shanghai to Nanchang, crashed on takeoff following an unexplained failure of the right engine, killing 34 of 40 people on board.
 On 6 April 1993, China Eastern Airlines Flight 583, a McDonnell-Douglas MD-11 flying from Beijing to Los Angeles via Shanghai, had an inadvertent deployment of the leading edge wing slats while cruising. The aircraft progressed through several violent pitch oscillations and lost  of altitude. Two passengers were killed, and 149 passengers and seven crew members were injured. The aircraft landed safely in Shemya, Alaska, United States.
 On 26 October 1993, China Eastern Flight 5398 from Shenzhen to Fuzhou, a McDonnell Douglas MD-82 overshot the runway and crashed at Fuzhou Yixu Airport after a failed attempt to go around on approach, killing two of 80 on board.
 On 10 September 1998, China Eastern Airlines Flight 586, a McDonnell-Douglas MD-11 flying from Shanghai Hongqiao International Airport to Beijing Capital International Airport, suffered a nose gear failure after take-off. The aircraft landed back in Shanghai with the nose gear up on a foamed runway. There were only nine reported injuries. The incident became the inspiration for the 1999 movie Crash Landing, directed by Zhang Jianya, which premiered on the 50th anniversary of the National Day of the People's Republic of China.
 On 21 November 2004, China Eastern Airlines Flight 5210, a Bombardier CRJ-200LR, crashed shortly after takeoff from Baotou Airport due to wing icing, killing all 53 on board and two people on the ground.
 On 7 June 2013, China Eastern Airlines Flight 2947, an Embraer ERJ-145LI (B-3052), ran off the runway on landing at Hongqiao Airport; all 49 on board survived. Investigation revealed that a servo valve in the nosewheel steering assembly was clogged. 
 On 21 March 2022, China Eastern Airlines Flight 5735 (operated by China Eastern Yunnan Airlines), a Boeing 737-89P flying from Kunming Changshui International Airport to Guangzhou Baiyun International Airport, crashed in a mountainous region in Molang Village, Teng County, Guangxi, killing all 123 passengers and 9 crew.

See also

 Civil aviation in China
 List of airlines of the People's Republic of China
 List of airports in China
 List of companies of the People's Republic of China
 Transport in China
 China Cargo Airlines (Cargo King)

References

External links 

 Official Website (Global)
 Official Website (Chinese Version)
 Official Website (US Version)
 China Eastern Yunnan Airlines 
 Investor Relations Asia Pacific
 China Eastern Airfreight Business Management System

 
Companies listed on the Shanghai Stock Exchange
Companies in the CSI 100 Index
Companies listed on the Hong Kong Stock Exchange
Companies listed on the New York Stock Exchange
Airlines established in 1988
Airlines of China
Chinese brands
Companies based in Shanghai
Government-owned companies of China
H shares
SkyTeam
Transport in Shanghai
Chinese companies established in 1988